The 1907 Wimbledon Championships took place on the outdoor grass courts at the All England Lawn Tennis and Croquet Club in Wimbledon, London, United Kingdom. The tournament ran from 24 June until 5 July. It was the 31st staging of the Wimbledon Championships, and the first Grand Slam tennis event of 1907.

The Prince and Princess of Wales (the future George V and Queen Mary) came as spectators. The Centre Court was protected by a tarpaulin cover for the first time.

Finals

Men's singles

 Norman Brookes defeated  Arthur Gore, 6–4, 6–2, 6–2

Women's singles

 May Sutton defeated  Dorothea Lambert Chambers, 6–1, 6–4

Men's doubles

 Norman Brookes /  Anthony Wilding defeated  Karl Behr /  Beals Wright, 6–4, 6–4, 6–2

References

External links
 Official Wimbledon Championships website

 
Wimbledon Championships
Wimbledon Championships
Wimbledon Championships
Wimbledon Championships